Ek Hi Raasta (Hindi: एक ही रास्ता, The Only Way) is a 1939 Hindi social film directed by Mehboob Khan. The director of photography was Faredoon Irani with story by Babubhai A. Mehta and Wajahat Mirza. The film was produced by Sagar Movietone. The cast included Arun Kumar Ahuja, Sheikh Mukhtar, Anuradha, Kanhaiyalal and Harish. This was the debut film of Sheikh Mukhtar who went on to act and direct several successful films. and Arun Kumar Ahuja, a prominent actor in the 1940s. Ek Hi Raasta  is a film about wrongs of society and its laws, and one of the early Hindi films to make a noticeable application of WW II.

Plot
Raja (Arun Kumar Ahuja) an orphan, Mangoo (Sheikh Mukhtar), a pickpocket, and Vithal (Harish), a hansom cab driver are friends. They live in the city where Mala (Anuradha) and her father (Gani) arrive from the village. Mangoo gets into an altercation with Mala’s father and kills him. Banke (Kanhaiyalal) kidnaps Mala and sells her to a wealthy man. Mala manages to escape and stays with Raja who helps her, both falling in love in the process. World War II intervenes and the three friends enlist. The film then revolves around the return from war and the killing of a rapist by one of them. He’s tried in court and convicted for killing the rapist.

Cast
Arun Kumar Ahuja as Raja 
Sheikh Mukhtar as Mangoo
Anuradha as Mala
Jyoti
Harish
Kanhaiyalal as Banke
Jagdish Raj
A. Banbasi as Madan
Devi as Mala’s stepmother
Gani as Mala’s father
Dewaskar
Mohan as Vithal

Music
The music director was Anil Biswas with lyrics written by Kidar Sharma and Pandit Indra Chandra.

Track listing

References

External links

1939 films
1930s Hindi-language films
Films directed by Mehboob Khan
Indian black-and-white films